Edward Beardsley was an American artist who has also been a professor, dean of the division of fine arts and the founder and program director of the UCR/California Museum of Photography. Possibly his most well-known work was featured on the cover of Alice Cooper's debut album, Pretties For You. He died in 2017 at the age of 78.

References

American artists
2017 deaths
Year of birth missing